Eliot Teltscher (born March 15, 1959) is a retired professional American tennis player. He won the 1983 French Open Mixed Doubles. His highest ranking in singles was #6 in the world and in doubles was #38 in the world.

Tennis career

Early years
Teltscher was born in Palos Verdes, California and lives in Irvine, California. His mother was born in Mandatory Palestine, and his father Eric, of Austrian descent, was a Holocaust survivor who immigrated to Mandatory Palestine and joined the British military, ultimately becoming an industrial engineer. He began playing tennis when he was nine, and by the time he was 17, he was ranked in the top ten in the United States junior rankings.

He attended UCLA in 1978 on a tennis scholarship, but dropped out to begin his professional tennis career.

Pro career
In 1979, Teltscher turned pro. A worldwide top 10 player from 1980 to 1982. He reached his highest singles ATP-ranking on May 7, 1982 when he became ranked No. 6 in the world.

He and his partner Terry Moor made it to the finals of the French Open in 1981, and he and Barbara Jordan won the mixed doubles title in 1983. He made it to the quarterfinals at the US Open in 1980, 1981, and 1983, where each time he was defeated by Jimmy Connors. He won 10 singles titles during his professional career, which ended in 1988.

Davis Cup
Teltscher was on the U.S. Davis Cup team in 1982, 1983, and 1985. His team defeated France in the 1982 tournament.

Coaching
He served as a coach for Justin Gimelstob, Richey Reneberg (1997), Jeff Tarango (1995), Pete Sampras, Jim Grabb (1992), Phillip King and others.

Teltscher served as a head men's tennis coach at Pepperdine University for the 1991–92 school season, and as a tennis coach at the Manhattan Beach Country Club from 1992 to 1997.

He was a coach of the US national team from 1998 to 2001, then he became the coach to Taylor Dent.

He was named USTA Director of Tennis Operations in December 2002.

Teltscher was named the 2003 Pan American Games Men's Coach.

Jewish Sports Hall of Fame
Teltscher, who is Jewish, was inducted into the National Jewish Sports Hall of Fame in 1991, into the Southern California Jewish Sports Hall of Fame in 1998, and into the International Jewish Sports Hall of Fame in 2009.

Grand Slam finals

Doubles

Mixed doubles

ATP Tour finals

Singles 24 (10–14)

Doubles 13 (4–9)

See also
List of select Jewish tennis players

References

External links
 
 
 
 USTA
 Teltscher v Onny Parun 1978 New Zealand Open final

1959 births
Living people
American male tennis players
French Open champions
Jewish American sportspeople
Jewish tennis players
People from Rancho Palos Verdes, California
Sportspeople from Irvine, California
People from Sebring, Florida
Tennis people from California
UCLA Bruins men's tennis players
Grand Slam (tennis) champions in mixed doubles
American people of Austrian-Jewish descent
American people of Israeli descent
21st-century American Jews